Juglans microcarpa, known also as the little walnut, Texas walnut, Texas black walnut or little black walnut (as it belongs to the "black walnuts" section Juglans sect. Rhysocaryon), is a large shrub or small tree (10–30 ft tall) which grows wild along streams and ravines in Texas, New Mexico, Oklahoma, and Kansas, and the northernmost states of Mexico. It produces nuts with a width of 1/2—3/4 in.  The pinnately compound leaves bear 7—25 untoothed to finely-toothed leaflets, each 1/4—1/2 in wide.  It is found at elevations ranging from 700 ft to 6700 ft.

Two varieties are recognized:  J. microcarpa var. microcarpa and J. microcarpa var. stewartii.

Where the range of J. microcarpa overlaps with  J. major, the two species interbreed, producing populations with intermediate characteristics.  This phenomenon has also been found where J. microcarpa trees grows near J. nigra trees.Juglans (literally "Jupiter's acorn") is the Latin name of the walnut.  Microcarpa'' means "having small fruit". Though very small, the seeds contained within the nuts are edible.

References and external links

Edible nuts and seeds
microcarpa
Trees of the North-Central United States
Trees of Mexico
Flora of Northeastern Mexico
Flora of the Sierra Madre Oriental